Mariusz Stańczuk (born 23 March 1983) is a Polish lightweight rower. He won a gold medal at the 2012 World Rowing Championships in Plovdiv with the lightweight men's quadruple scull.

References

1983 births
Living people
Polish male rowers
World Rowing Championships medalists for Poland
Rowers from Warsaw